Daisy Hill Hospital  is an acute teaching hospital located in Newry, Co Armagh, Northern Ireland.

It is situated on the Hospital Road and backs onto the A25 Camlough Road. It is managed by the Southern Health and Social Care Trust.

History
The hospital has its origins in the Newry Union Workhouse and Infirmary completed in 1841. Following a major fire, the facilities were rebuilt in 1902. The facility was renamed Daisy Hill Hospital in the 1930s and a modern medical block was added in 1973.

In February 2003 the hospital was designated as one of the nine acute hospitals in the acute hospital network of Northern Ireland on which healthcare would be focused under the government health policy 'Developing Better Services'.

Following fears that the accident and emergency department would close, the Trust announced a reprieve in May 2017.

University affiliations
The hospital is associated with the Queen's University Belfast Medical School.

References

External links 
 
 Regulation and Quality Improvement Authority inspection reports

Southern Health and Social Care Trust
Teaching hospitals in Northern Ireland
Hospitals in County Armagh
Health and Social Care (Northern Ireland) hospitals
Newry
1841 establishments in Ireland
Hospitals established in 1841